Joseph Henry McClure (3 November 1907 – 1973) was an English football wing half who played in the Football League, best remembered for his four years with Everton. He later became a manager in non-League football with Nuneaton Borough.

Personal life 
McClure grew up in Workington with 10 siblings and his uncle was footballer Alec McClure. He had four children with his wife Martha, before he "virtually abandoned" the family in the 1920s when his football career took off and later had four children with another woman. Martha, who refused to divorce him, died in 1968. While with Wallsend, McClure trained to be a welder and worked as a bar steward in later life. McClure's son Peter went on to play football for local Workington non-league club Salterbeck.

Honours 
Everton
 Football League Second Division: 1930–31
Nuneaton Town
 Nuneaton Hospital Cup: 1937

Career statistics

References

1907 births
1973 deaths
People from Cockermouth
English footballers
Association football wing halves
Egremont F.C. players
Workington A.F.C. players
Preston North End F.C. players
Whitehaven Athletic F.C. players
Leamington F.C. players
Everton F.C. players
Brentford F.C. players
Exeter City F.C. players
Nuneaton Borough F.C. players
English Football League players
English football managers
Nuneaton Borough F.C. managers
Footballers from Cumbria